Justin Lee Watkins (born May 27, 1979) is a former Democratic member of the Nevada Assembly. He represented the 35th district, which covers parts of the southwestern Las Vegas Valley.

Biography
Watkins was born in Las Vegas in 1979, and graduated from Oregon State University in 2001. He received his Juris Doctor from the University of San Diego School of Law in 2004. Watkins practices law with Battle Born Injury Lawyers, a firm that includes fellow Assemblyman Steve Yeager. He is licensed to practice law in California, Nevada, and Utah.

Watkins ran for the Assembly in 2016. He was unopposed in the Democratic primary and defeated incumbent Republican Brent A. Jones.

In October 2017, Watkins announced he would not seek reelection in 2018.

Personal life
Watkins and his wife, Marni, have 2 daughters; Adyson and Sydney.

Political positions
Watkins identifies as a moderate Democrat. He supports expanding background checks for gun purchases.

Electoral history

References

External links
 

1979 births
Living people
Democratic Party members of the Nevada Assembly
Nevada lawyers
Oregon State University alumni
Politicians from Las Vegas
University of San Diego School of Law alumni
21st-century American politicians